The River of Time (1986) is a collection of science fiction short stories by American writer David Brin.

Contents
"The Crystal Spheres" (first published in 1984) (Winner of the Hugo Award in 1985 in the Short Story category)
"The Loom of Thessaly" (first published in 1981)
"The Fourth Vocation of George Gustaf" (first published in 1984)
"Senses Three and Six"
"Toujours Voir"
"A Stage of Memory"
"Just a Hint" (first published in 1980)
"Tank Farm Dynamo" (first published in 1983)
"Thor Meets Captain America"
"Lungfish"
"The River of Time" (first published in 1981 as "Coexistence" in Isaac Asimov's Science Fiction Magazine)*

Sources, references, external links, quotations

Reception
Dave Langford reviewed The River of Time for White Dwarf #94, and stated that "more conventional but contains some nice genre-mixing: in 'The Loom of Thessaly' the weaving Fates encounter spaceborne weaponry, and 'Thor Meets Captain America' offers a nasty world where Hitler did achieve his dreams of recruiting supernatural aid."

Reviews
Review by Dan Chow (1986) in Locus, #307 August 1986
Review by Don D'Ammassa (1987) in Science Fiction Chronicle, #93 June 1987
Review by Paul Kincaid (1987) in Paperback Inferno, #69
Review by W. Paul Ganley (1987) in Fantasy Mongers Quarterly, #22 Spring 1987

References

1986 short story collections
Short story collections by David Brin